Two-Minute Drill is a 2007 children's book by Mike Lupica and the first book in his Comeback Kids series.

Synopsis
Scott Parry is not only the new kid, but he's also the clumsiest and smartest kid in school. Chris Conlan is the school's golden boy and the quarterback of the football team. Scott joins the football team, which causes him to cross paths with Chris. Initially the two seem like the unlikeliest pairing in the world, but a shared secret pulls them together.

Reception
Two-Minute Drill received reviews from the Horn Book Guide, School Library Journal, and Kirkus Reviews.

References

2007 American novels
American children's novels
American sports novels
American football books
Novels set in schools
2007 children's books